Communist Party of Sweden was a political party in Sweden led by Zeth Höglund. Höglund broke away from the main SKP in 1924, following disagreements concerning Comintern policies and functioning. He then set up his own SKP. Höglund's SKP had around 5,000 members, and published the newspaper Den Nya Politiken.

In 1926 SKP of Höglund merged into the Social Democrats.

Höglund's SKP had a youth wing called Arbetarnas Ungdomsförbund.

References

External links
1924 election manifesto of the party